State of Mind is an album by Canadian country music group, the Hunter Brothers. It was released on January 25, 2019, via Open Road Recordings. It includes the #1 single "Lost", as well as "Northern Lights" and "Silver Lining". The album was nominated for Country Album of the Year at the 2020 Juno Awards.

Singles 
"Lost" was released as the debut single off the album in November 2018, and became their first #1 on the Canada Country chart. It was also their first charting entry on the Canadian Hot 100 at #100 and was certified Gold by Music Canada.

"Northern Lights" was released as the second single to radio in May 2019. It peaked at #16 on Canadian country radio.

"Silver Lining" was released as the third single to radio in October 2019. It peaked at #11 on Canadian country radio.

Track listing

Charts

Album

Singles

Awards and nominations

Release history

References

2019 albums
Open Road Recordings albums